Charles Crump (7 November 1837 – 22 February 1912) was a New Zealand cricketer. He played two first-class matches for Otago between 1864 and 1868.

Crump was born at Derby in England in 1837 and moved to New Zealand in 1862. He was town clerk of the Waihemo County Council in North Otago for about 25 years, and resided in Palmerston for 44 years until his death there in February 1912.

References

External links
 

1837 births
1912 deaths
New Zealand cricketers
Otago cricketers
Cricketers from Derby
English emigrants to New Zealand
City and town clerks
People from Palmerston, New Zealand